Junaidah Aman (born 18 February 1955) is a Malaysian sprinter. She competed in the women's 400 metres at the 1972 Summer Olympics.

References

External links

1955 births
Living people
Athletes (track and field) at the 1972 Summer Olympics
Malaysian female sprinters
Olympic athletes of Malaysia
Asian Games medalists in athletics (track and field)
Asian Games bronze medalists for Malaysia
Athletes (track and field) at the 1974 Asian Games
Medalists at the 1974 Asian Games
Olympic female sprinters